Pourouma is a genus of at least 20–25 species of flowering plants in the family Urticaceae, or alternately, the Cecropiaceae, native to tropical regions of Central and South America.

The species are trees growing to 20 m tall. The leaves are spirally arranged, palmately veined, with an entire margin. They are dioecious, with male and female flowers on separate trees. The fruit is fleshy.

Selected species
 Pourouma bicolor
 Pourouma bolivarensis
 Pourouma cecropiifolia — Amazon grape, mapati
 Pourouma cordata
 Pourouma montana
 Pourouma napoensis
 Pourouma oraria
 Pourouma petiolulata
 Pourouma saulensis
 Pourouma stipulacea

References

 
Urticaceae genera
Taxonomy articles created by Polbot
Dioecious plants